Michael John Kilborn (born 20 September 1962) is an Australian former cricketer and a cardiologist and electrophysiologist at Royal Prince Alfred Hospital in Sydney.

Early life
Kilborn was born at Gunnedah, New South Wales in September 1962. He completed his Higher School Certificate at Tamworth's Farrer Memorial Agricultural High School in 1980, placing eighth in New South Wales that year. He initially intended to study science and law, but changed to science and medicine at the last moment under the influence of his grandmother. He commenced science/medicine studies at the University of New South Wales before winning the Rhodes Scholarship in 1985 and completing his qualifying medical degree (BM BCh) and PhD (DPhil) at the University of Oxford.

Cricket
While studying at Oxford, Kilborn made his debut in first-class cricket for Oxford University Cricket Club against Gloucstershire at Oxford in 1986. He played first-class cricket for Oxford until 1990, making 29 appearances. Playing as a batsman, he scored 1,217 runs at an average of 28.97. He made seven half-centuries, with a high score of 95. With his part-time right-arm medium pace bowling, he took 6 wickets with best figures of 3 for 37.

Kilborn also made two first-class appearances for a combined Oxford and Cambridge Universities cricket team against the touring Pakistanis in 1987 and the touring New Zealanders in 1990.

In addition to playing first-class cricket while at Oxford, Kilborn also made two List A one-day appearances for the Combined Universities cricket team in the 1988 Benson & Hedges Cup.

Medicine
After graduating from Oxford with a DPhil in Physiological Sciences, Kilborn became a cardiologist.

Before returning permanently to Australia, Kilborn spent over 3 years in the United States as a Fellow and Assistant Professor in Clinical Cardiac Electrophysiology and in Clinical Pharmacology at the Georgetown University Medical Center and the Washington DC Veterans Affairs Medical Center.

Kilborn is the senior staff cardiologist and director of the Arrhythmia Service and ECG Laboratory at the Royal Prince Alfred Hospital, Sydney.

References

External links
 

1962 births
Living people
University of Sydney alumni
Australian Rhodes Scholars
Alumni of St John's College, Oxford
Australian cricketers
Oxford University cricketers
Oxford and Cambridge Universities cricketers
British Universities cricketers
20th-century Australian medical doctors
21st-century Australian medical doctors
Australian cardiologists